"That's Why I'm Here" is a song written by Mark Alan Springer and Shaye Smith and recorded by American country music artist Kenny Chesney.  It was released in March 1998 as the third single from Chesney’s 1997 album I Will Stand.  The song became Chesney's sixth Top 10 hit on the U.S. Billboard Hot Country Songs chart, reaching number 2.

Content
Chesney told Billboard magazine that the song was his favorite on the album. "The thing that is so cool about this song is that it's about an alcoholic that's struggling to get better, but it has a happy ending and there's a lot of hope in this song."

Music video
The music video was directed by Martin Kahan, and premiered on CMT on December 25, 1997, during "The CMT Delivery Room", 3 months before the single's release.

Chart positions

Year-end charts

References

1998 singles
1997 songs
Kenny Chesney songs
Song recordings produced by Norro Wilson
Song recordings produced by Buddy Cannon
Songs written by Mark Alan Springer
Songs written by Shaye Smith
BNA Records singles